Richard Bowditch "Dick" Wigglesworth (April 25, 1891 – October 22, 1960) was an American football player and coach and United States Representative from Massachusetts. He was born in Boston. He graduated from Milton Academy in 1908.

He attended Harvard University, where he was the starting quarterback for the Harvard Crimson football team from 1909 to 1911.

Wigglesworth graduated from Harvard in 1912, and from Harvard Law School in 1916. He also served as a graduate coach of the Harvard football team starting in 1912. He was assistant private secretary to the Governor General of the Philippine Islands. He was admitted to the bar and commenced practice in Boston.

During World War I he served overseas as captain, Battery E, and as commanding officer, First Battalion, Three Hundred and Third Field Artillery, Seventy-sixth Division, 1917–1919. He served as legal adviser to the Assistant Secretary of the Treasury in charge of foreign loans and railway payments, and secretary of the World War Debt Commission 1922–1924. He was assistant to the agent general for reparation payments, Berlin, Germany 1924–1927. He was general counsel and Paris representative for organizations created under the Dawes plan in 1927 and 1928.

Wigglesworth was elected as a Republican to the Seventieth Congress to fill the vacancy caused by the death of Louis A. Frothingham. He was reelected to the Seventy-first and to the fourteen succeeding Congresses and served from November 6, 1928, until his resignation November 13, 1958. Wigglesworth voted in favor of the Civil Rights Act of 1957. He served as United States Ambassador to Canada from December 15, 1958, until his death in Boston on October 22, 1960.  His interment was in Arlington National Cemetery.

Wigglesworth married Florence Joyes Booth in 1931, and they had three daughters, Ann, Mary and Jane.

See also
 List of members of the American Legion

References

1891 births
1960 deaths
Politicians from Boston
Military personnel from Massachusetts
Milton Academy alumni
Harvard Law School alumni
Harvard Crimson football players
Harvard Crimson football coaches
Burials at Arlington National Cemetery
Ambassadors of the United States to Canada
Republican Party members of the United States House of Representatives from Massachusetts
20th-century American politicians